Thornton (formerly known as Simmonsville and Lower Simmons Village) is a neighborhood located in the north-west part of Cranston, Rhode Island on the Johnston line and extends into the Johnston side.

Many of the residents of this Thornton are Italian-American, and the Feast of Saint Rocco, a Christian saint, is held every August on the grounds of St. Rocco's Church and remains an important cultural event in the community. Saint Rocco's Church was formerly on the Cranston side of Thornton on Clemence Street until the new church opened in 1951 on Atwood Avenue on the Johnston side of Thornton.

References

External links 
 The life of Elder Abel Thornton: late of Johnston, R.I. A preacher in the Free-Will Baptist Connexion, and a member of the R.I.Q. meeting (Google eBook) (1828)

Italian-American culture in Rhode Island
Neighborhoods in Rhode Island
Populated places in Providence County, Rhode Island
Cranston, Rhode Island
Johnston, Rhode Island